The 2003 WAC men's basketball tournament was held in the Reynolds Center in Tulsa, Oklahoma.  The winners of the tournament were the #1 seeded Tulsa Golden Hurricane.

Bracket

References

WAC men's basketball tournament
Tournament
WAC men's basketball tournament